The Irish Professional Championship was an invitational professional snooker tournament for mostly Irish and Northern Irish snooker players.

History 
The Irish Professional Championship was first staged in 1947 in Northern Ireland, and Jackie Rea became the inaugural champion. After that the event was held on a challenge basis, with the champion choosing his challenger. Rea won the championship every year but one until 1972, when he was beaten 28–12 by Alex Higgins. Higgins could defend the title four times in a row, before losing the title to Dennis Taylor. Taylor defended the title in the following two years. During this time the tournament was only sponsored in 1978 by Benson & Hedges and in 1979 by Smithwicks Brewery.

In 1982 the tournament was converted to a knock-out tournament. Eight players took part, and was sponsored by Smithwicks Brewery. Higgins and Taylor won nine titles between them, and their run of success in the championship was interrupted only by Jack McLaughlin, in 1988. After the 1983 event Smithwicks ended their sponsorship, and Strongbow took over for 1985 and 1986 and Matchroom for 1987. After the 1989 event the World Professional Billiards and Snooker Association withdrew their backing to national championships in form of £1,000 per player, and the event was discontinued.

In 1992 the event was revived with sponsorship by Murphy's, and for the first time, the event was held in Republic of Ireland. 34 players competed at the event. When Joe Swail and Jason Prince contested the 1992 final, it was the first time in over 20 years it featured neither Higgins or Taylor. It was held again in 1993, but was abandoned again. The event was held again between 2005 and 2007.

Winners

See also
Irish Masters
Irish Open
Northern Ireland Trophy
Irish Classic
2011 Alex Higgins International Trophy
Northern Ireland Open

References

 
Snooker non-ranking competitions
Recurring sporting events established in 1947
Recurring events disestablished in 2007
1947 establishments in Ireland
2007 disestablishments in Ireland
Snooker competitions in Northern Ireland
Snooker competitions in Ireland
Defunct snooker competitions
Snooker